Isaban is an unincorporated community located on Fourpole Creek, in McDowell and Mingo counties in the U.S. state of West Virginia.

The community's name is an amalgamation of the names Isabel and Ann.

References 

Unincorporated communities in McDowell County, West Virginia
Unincorporated communities in Mingo County, West Virginia
Unincorporated communities in West Virginia
Coal towns in West Virginia